The galactic coordinate system is a celestial coordinate system in spherical coordinates, with the Sun as its center, the primary direction aligned with the approximate center of the Milky Way Galaxy, and the fundamental plane parallel to an approximation of the galactic plane but offset to its north. It uses the right-handed convention, meaning that coordinates are positive toward the north and toward the east in the fundamental plane.

Spherical coordinates

Galactic longitude 

Longitude (symbol ) measures the angular distance of an object eastward along the galactic equator from the Galactic Center. Analogous to terrestrial longitude, galactic longitude is usually measured in degrees (°).

Galactic latitude 
Latitude (symbol ) measures the angle of an object northward of the galactic equator (or midplane) as viewed from Earth. Analogous to terrestrial latitude, galactic latitude is usually measured in degrees (°).

Definition 

The first galactic coordinate system was used by William Herschel in 1785. A number of different coordinate systems, each differing by a few degrees, were used until 1932, when Lund Observatory assembled a set of conversion tables that defined a standard galactic coordinate system based on a galactic north pole at RA , dec +28° (in the B1900.0 epoch convention) and a 0° longitude at the point where the galactic plane and equatorial plane intersected.

In 1958, the International Astronomical Union (IAU) defined the galactic coordinate system in reference to radio observations of galactic neutral hydrogen through the hydrogen line, changing the definition of the Galactic longitude by 32° and the latitude by 1.5°. In the equatorial coordinate system, for equinox and equator of 1950.0, the north galactic pole is defined at right ascension , declination +27.4°, in the constellation Coma Berenices, with a probable error of ±0.1°. Longitude 0° is the great semicircle that originates from this point along the line in position angle 123° with respect to the equatorial pole. The galactic longitude increases in the same direction as right ascension. Galactic latitude is positive towards the north galactic pole, with a plane passing through the Sun and parallel to the galactic equator being 0°, whilst the poles are ±90°. Based on this definition, the galactic poles and equator can be found from spherical trigonometry and can be precessed to other epochs; see the table.

This convention is occasionally seen.

Rounded to the same number of digits as the table, −29.01° (J2000), there is an offset of about 0.07° from the defined coordinate center, well within the 1958 error estimate of ±0.1°. Since as defined the galactic coordinate system does not rotate with time, Sgr A* is actually decreasing in longitude at the rate of galactic rotation at the sun, approximately 5.7 milliarcseconds per year (see Oort constants).

Conversion between equatorial and galactic coordinates
An object's location expressed in the equatorial coordinate system can be transformed into the galactic coordinate system. In these equations,  is right ascension,  is declination. NGP refers to the coordinate values of the north galactic pole and NCP to those of the north celestial pole.

The reverse (galactic to equatorial) can also be accomplished with the following conversion formulas.

Rectangular coordinates
In some applications use is made of rectangular coordinates based on galactic longitude and latitude and distance. In some work regarding the distant past or future the galactic coordinate system is taken as rotating so that the -axis always goes to the centre of the galaxy.

There are two major rectangular variations of galactic coordinates, commonly used for computing space velocities of galactic objects. In these systems the -axes are designated , but the definitions vary by author. In one system, the  axis is directed toward the Galactic Center ( = 0°), and it is a right-handed system (positive towards the east and towards the north galactic pole); in the other, the  axis is directed toward the galactic anticenter ( = 180°), and it is a left-handed system (positive towards the east and towards the north galactic pole).

In the constellations

The galactic equator runs through the following constellations:

Sagittarius
Serpens
Scutum
Aquila
Sagitta
Vulpecula
Cygnus
Cepheus
Cassiopeia
Camelopardalis
Perseus
Auriga
Taurus
Gemini
Orion
Monoceros
Canis Major
Puppis
Vela
Carina
Crux
Centaurus
Circinus
Norma
Ara
Scorpius
Ophiuchus

See also

References

External links
  Universal coordinate converter.
  Galactic Coordinate System - Wolfram Demonstration
 Galactic coordinates, The Internet Encyclopedia of Science
 Fiona Vincent, Positional Astronomy: Galactic coordinates, University of St Andrews
 An Atlas of the Universe

Astronomical coordinate systems
Milky Way
Orientation (geometry)